The 2007 CAF Champions League was the 43rd occurrence of the CAF Champions League, the most prestigious club football competition in Africa. Étoile du Sahel of Tunisia became champions for the first time, beating Al Ahly SC of Egypt 3–1 in a two-legged final. Étoile du Sahel participated in the 2007 FIFA Club World Cup in Japan as the representative from CAF.

Qualifying rounds

Preliminary round
The 1st legs were played on 26–28 January 2007.
The 2nd legs were played on 9–11 February 2007.

|}
1 JS Saint-Pierroise withdrew on the weekend before the tie due to high travel costs; they were banned from CAF competitions for three years and fined $3500.
2 Sporting Clube da Praia refused to travel to Guinea due to civil unrest and a violent general strike. 
3 Super ESCOM withdrew. 
4 AS Douanes were ejected from the competition for fielding an ineligible player.
5 The tie was played over one leg as AJSM did not have a FIFA or CAF-standard stadium.

First round
1st legs were played on 2–4 March 2007.
2nd legs were played on 16–18 March 2007.

|}
1 The match was abandoned at 82' with Maranatha leading 2-0, after APR FC walked off protesting a penalty award against them; APR FC were ejected from the competition and banned from CAF competitions for three years.

Second round
1st legs were played on 6–8 April 2007.
2nd legs were played on 20–22 April 2007.

|}

Group stage

Group A

Group B

Knockout stage

Bracket

Semi-finals
The first legs were played on 21–23 September and the second legs on 5–7 October.

                       

|}

Final

Top goalscorers 
The top scorers from the 2007 CAF Champions League are as follows:

See also
CAF Confederation Cup 2007
CAF Super Cup
2007 FIFA Club World Cup

External links
Official Site
"African Club Competitions 2007" at RSSSF
Official MTN CAF Champions League Website
Jose: African Refereeing A Disgrace

 
CAF Champions League seasons
1